Belaya Beryozka is an urban-type settlement in Trubchevsky District of Bryansk Oblast, Russia. It is located on the left bank of the Desna River. Population:

References

Notes

Sources

Urban-type settlements in Bryansk Oblast
Trubchevsky Uyezd